Ipeke Airport  is an airstrip serving Ipeke, a village on the western shore of Lake Mai-Ndombe in Mai-Ndombe Province, Democratic Republic of the Congo.

See also

Transport in the Democratic Republic of the Congo
List of airports in the Democratic Republic of the Congo

References

External links
OpenStreetMap - Ipeke
 FallingRain - Ipeke Airport
 HERE Maps - Ipeke Airport
 OurAirports - Ipeke Airport

Airports in Mai-Ndombe Province